Michał Jakub Ignerski (born August 13, 1980) is a Polish former professional basketball player.

Professional career
Ignerski was the Polish Cup MVP in 2005. He finished his pro career with Pallacanestro Cantù, in Italy.

National team career
As a member of the senior Polish national basketball team, Ignerski played at the 2011 EuroBasket, and the 2013 EuroBasket.

External links 
 Eurobasket.com Profile
 Legabasket.it Profile 

1980 births
Living people
Bacone Warriors men's basketball players
BC Krasnye Krylia players
BC Nizhny Novgorod players
Beşiktaş men's basketball players
Gipuzkoa Basket players
Dinamo Sassari players
Junior college men's basketball players in the United States
KK Włocławek players
Le Mans Sarthe Basket players
Liga ACB players
Mississippi State Bulldogs men's basketball players
Pallacanestro Cantù players
Pallacanestro Virtus Roma players
PBC Lokomotiv-Kuban players
Polish men's basketball players
Polish expatriate basketball people in Spain
Polish expatriate basketball people in Turkey
Polish expatriate basketball people in the United States
Power forwards (basketball)
Real Betis Baloncesto players
Sportspeople from Lublin